Abdul Qadir Sanjrani (Sindhi: عبدالقادر سنجراٹي) was a Pakistani politician from Shahpur Chakar, Sindh. He served as 5th Finance minister of Pakistan and Health minister of West Pakistan. He also served as Pakistani ambassador to Kenya. He was elected as Member of Provincial Assembly of Sindh in 1970 elections contesting from PS-41 Sanghar at ticket of PML-Q defeating the future CM of Sindh Jam Sadiq Ali's brother, Jam Anwar Ali.

Family history
Abdul Qadir Sanjrani belongs to influential family in Shahpur Chakar.

References

Federal ministers of Pakistan
People from Sanghar District